Jennylyn Reyes (born January 12, 1991) is a Filipino volleyball athlete who competed with PSL Manila in the 2016 FIVB Club World Championship.

Career
Reyes played for Meralco Power Spikers from 2013 to 2015. She was awarded Best Libero in the 2015 Philippine Super Liga All-Filipino.
She played for Petron Tri-Activ Spikers before being selected to play with Foton Pilipinas in the 2016 Asian Club Championship and with PSL Manila for the 2016 FIVB Club World Championship. She won the bronze medal in the 2017 PSL Grand Prix Conference with the Foton Tornadoes.

Clubs
  Philippine Army Lady Troopers (2011)
  Cignal HD Spikers (2013)
  Cagayan Valley Lady Rising Suns (2013)
  Meralco Power Spikers (2013–2015)
  Petron Tri-Activ Spikers (2014–2016)
  Kia Forte (2015)
  Foton Pilipinas (2016)
  PSL Manila (2016)
  Foton Tornadoes (2017–2020)

Awards

Individuals
 UAAP Season 73 "Best Digger"
 Shakey's V-League 8th Season - 1st Conference "Best Digger"
 Shakey's V-League 8th Season - Open Conference "Best Receiver"
 UAAP Season 75 "Best Receiver"
 UAAP Season 75 "Best Digger"
 Shakey's V-League 10th Season - 1st Conference "Best Receiver"
 Shakey's V-League 10th Season - Open Conference "Best Receiver"
 2013 Philippine Super Liga Invitational "Best Receiver"
 2014 Philippine Super Liga Grand Prix "Best Libero"
 Shakey's V-League 12th Season - Open Conference "Best Libero"
 2015 Philippine Super Liga All-Filipino "Best Libero"
 2015 Philippine Super Liga Grand Prix "Best Libero"

Clubs
 2017 Philippine Superliga Grand Prix –  Bronze medal, with Foton Tornadoes

References

Living people
National University (Philippines) alumni
University Athletic Association of the Philippines volleyball players
1991 births
Liberos
Philippines women's international volleyball players
Filipino women's volleyball players